Desert Power & Water Co. Electric Power Plant is located at 120 Andy Devine Avenue in Kingman, Arizona. The building was built in 1907–08 with additions in the following years 1909 through 1911. Tracy Engineering Company was the architect and McCafe Contracting Company of Los Angeles was the contractor. The oil-fired plant was considered one of the largest steam electric power plants in the Western United States. It had a powerhouse, transformer house and office for Desert Power and Water. It operated until 1938; Hoover Dam took over the power supply. The building was vacant for some time, then used as a salvage yard.

In 1984, two local woman (Lilia Bumbullis & Cynthia McCafferty) got together and formed a group known as "The Powerhouse Gang." The group began a fund-raising pitch: “Join the Powerhouse GangElectrify Kingman”. In 1997, the building was open to the public as the "Powerhouse Visitor Center” and housed an Arizona Visitor Information Center, the Historic Route 66 Association of Arizona Gift Shop, and Memory Lane 50's Diner (closed in 2003).  A front-page article in The Kingman Daily Miner (local paper) on October 22, 1997, wrote that “…the building officially begins its new life as a visitor center designed to generate tourism energy”.

The building belongs to the City of Kingman and is the home of the Kingman Tourism Office and Visitor Center, the Historic Route 66 Association of Arizona and the "Arizona Route 66 Museum".

The building was placed on the National Register of Historic Places on May 4, 1986.

References

External links
 Route 66 Museum – official site

Energy infrastructure completed in 1908
Buildings and structures in Kingman, Arizona
Buildings and structures on U.S. Route 66
Industrial buildings and structures on the National Register of Historic Places in Arizona
Power stations in Arizona
Former oil-fired power stations in the United States
Energy infrastructure on the National Register of Historic Places
Transportation museums in Arizona
Museums in Mohave County, Arizona
National Register of Historic Places in Kingman, Arizona
1908 establishments in Arizona Territory
Former power stations in Arizona